Hartsfield is a surname. Notable people with the surname include:

Bob Hartsfield (1931–1999), American baseball player
Henry Hartsfield (1933–2014), American astronaut and United States Air force officer
Myles Hartsfield (born 1997), American football player
Phill Hartsfield (1932–2010), American knifemaker and weapon designer
Roy Hartsfield (1925–2011), American baseball player
William B. Hartsfield (1890–1971), American politician

See also
Hartsfield–Jackson Atlanta International Airport, airport in Atlanta, Georgia, United States